Isaac Davis (June 2, 1799 – April 1, 1883) was a lawyer and politician active in Worcester, Massachusetts.

Biography 
Davis was born in Northborough, Massachusetts, graduated from Brown University in 1822, studied law until admitted to the bar in 1825, and began the practice in Worcester, Massachusetts, where he soon rose to eminence. He was, from 1843 to 1854, a member of the Massachusetts Senate, and three times mayor of Worcester from 1856 to 1859, in 1858, and 1861. Davis also served on the boards of various banks and railroad companies.

Davis was a promoter of popular education. From 1838 to 1851 Davis was on the board of trustees of Brown University, and became a Fellow in 1851; Davis also was a trustee of Columbian College (now George Washington University), Norwich University, and Waterville College (now Colby College). Davis served as first President of the Worcester Academy Board of Trustees, from 1834 to 1873, and for some time was an active member of the Massachusetts Board of Education. He was president of the Worcester County Horticultural Society from 1844 to 1848. He was elected a member of the American Antiquarian Society in 1841, and later served on its board of councilors from 1850 to 1883.

Davis died in Worcester, Massachusetts, in 1883.

See also 
 Isaac Davis House

Notes

References 
 
 Historical catalogue of Brown university, Providence, Rhode Island, 1764-1894, Brown University, Press of P. S. Remington & co., 1895, page 84.

1799 births
Brown University alumni
Massachusetts state senators
Massachusetts lawyers
Mayors of Worcester, Massachusetts
People of Massachusetts in the American Civil War
1883 deaths
School board members in Massachusetts
Members of the American Antiquarian Society
19th-century American politicians
19th-century American lawyers